This is a season-by-season list of records compiled by Providence in men's ice hockey.

Providence College has won one NCAA Championship in its history

Season-by-season results

Note: GP = Games played, W = Wins, L = Losses, T = Ties

* Winning percentage is used when conference schedules are unbalanced.† Providence has three separate people serve as head coach during their first official season.

Footnotes

References

 
Lists of college men's ice hockey seasons in the United States
Providence Friars ice hockey seasons